Asa Keyes (August 9, 1877 – October 18, 1934) was district attorney of Los Angeles County, California from June 1923 until 1928, when he was found guilty of accepting a bribe from the Julian Petroleum Company and was sentenced to five years' imprisonment. He was pardoned by Governor James Rolph in August 1933.

Keyes was born August 9, 1877, in Wilmington, California, and attended the University of Southern California, after which he entered the district attorney's office. When Thomas L. Woolwine resigned in June 1923, Keyes stepped into his position. A year later Keyes called upon 87 department employees to resign, and he reappointed only 27 of them to form his new team. During 1924 he caused the average length of a felony trial to be cut from 130 to 51 days.

When he died on October 18, 1934, he left his wife, Lillian, and two daughters, Elizabeth and Mrs. Fred McGuire.

See also

 Ku Klux Klan in Inglewood, California, for one of Keyes' notable cases

References

District attorneys in California
Lawyers from Los Angeles
University of Southern California alumni
1877 births
1934 deaths
People from Wilmington, Los Angeles